

Albums

Studio albums

Soundtracks

Compilation albums

Singles

* From November 30, 1963 to January 23, 1965, Billboard did not publish an R&B singles chart.

DVD release
 "Movin On Up: The Music and Message of Curtis Mayfield and The Impressions" (2008)

See also
Curtis Mayfield discography

References

External links
 

Discographies of American artists

Rhythm and blues discographies
Soul music discographies
Discography